This is a list of Newsboys songs. Note all personnel listed simply as Taylor refer to Steve Taylor. Contributions from Sean Taylor are listed with his given name.

See also
Newsboys discography

References

Newsboys
Newsboys songs